Mneme Lake is the oval-shaped 220 m long in southwest–northeast direction and 85 m wide lake on the northwest coast of Livingston Island in the South Shetland Islands, Antarctica. It has a surface area of 1.3 ha and is separated from the waters of Barclay Bay by a 12 to 40 m wide strip of land. The lake and its vicinity lye in a restricted zone of scientific importance to Antarctic microbiology, part of the Antarctic Specially Protected Area Byers Peninsula.

The feature is named after Mneme, the nymph of memory in Greek mythology.

Location
Bulgarian mapping of the area in 2009 and 2017.

Maps
 L. Ivanov. Antarctica: Livingston Island and Greenwich, Robert, Snow and Smith Islands. Scale 1:120000 topographic map. Troyan: Manfred Wörner Foundation, 2009. 
 L. Ivanov. Antarctica: Livingston Island and Smith Island. Scale 1:100000 topographic map. Manfred Wörner Foundation, 2017. 
 Antarctic Digital Database (ADD). Scale 1:250000 topographic map of Antarctica. Scientific Committee on Antarctic Research (SCAR). Since 1993, regularly upgraded and updated

See also
 Antarctic lakes
 Livingston Island

Notes

References
 Mneme Lake. SCAR Composite Gazetteer of Antarctica
 Bulgarian Antarctic Gazetteer. Antarctic Place-names Commission. (details in Bulgarian, basic data in English)
 Management Plan for Antarctic Specially Protected Area No. 126 Byers Peninsula. Measure 4 (2016), ATCM XXXIX Final Report. Santiago, 2016

External links
 Mneme Lake. Adjusted Copernix satellite image

Bodies of water of Livingston Island
Lakes of the South Shetland Islands
Bulgaria and the Antarctic